The Mitchell Alpha .45 is a pistol manufactured by the American Mitchell Arms company. It is .45 ACP in calibre and its magazine size is 8 rounds. The Alpha uses the Browning-type locking mechanism and weighs 39 ounces. There is no trigger stop on the pistol and its sights are fixed. Its external safety is compatible to the ambidextrous shooter, with an ambidextrous safety catch.

References

Semi-automatic pistols of the United States
.45 ACP semi-automatic pistols